The King of the Jungle most often refers to:

 Lion
 Tarzan
 King Kong

Media
 King of the Jungle (TV series), an American reality show
 King of the Jungle (Indonesian TV series), a Indonesian television adventure series broadcast by Trans TV
 King of the Jungle (serial), a lost 1927 film serial
 King of the Jungle (2000 film), a film starring John Leguizamo
 King of the Jungle (1933 film), a film starring Buster Crabbe
 "King of the Jungle" (song), a song by Bananarama from the 1984 self-titled album
 King of the Jungle (company) a British video-game developer; see Agent Armstrong
 "King of the Jungle", an episode of Jungle Jam and Friends: The Radio Show!
 "King of the Jungle", an episode of The King is Dead
 King of the Jungle records, a record label run by DJ Dextrous and Rude Boy Keith

People
 Mark Henry, professional wrestler with the nickname of "The King of the Jungle"

See also
Jungle King